Gordon C. Felts House is a historic home located at Galax, Virginia.  It was completed in 1930, and is a large -story stuccoed brick dwelling in the Mission Revival style.  It features a terra cotta mission style gabled roof.  It also has a large bluestone terrace covered by a pergola supported by six large Grecian Doric order columns, on the south side the house has an enclosed sleeping porch defined with four large Grecian Doric columns. Also on the property are a contributing garage / apartment and playhouse. Currently owned by Nancy and Dr. Samuel B. Luague.

It was listed on the National Register of Historic Places in 2000.

References

Houses on the National Register of Historic Places in Virginia
Mission Revival architecture in Virginia
Houses completed in 1930
Houses in Galax, Virginia
National Register of Historic Places in Galax, Virginia